Lieutenant-General Sir Richard Doherty ( O'Dogherty; 1785 – 2 September 1862) was an Irish colonial administrator and a British Army officer who served as  Governor of Sierra Leone.

Biography
Born Richard O'Dogherty in 1785 into an Irish Catholic family at Garculea House in Coolmoyne, near Golden, County Tipperary. He was the eldest of four sons born to Leonard O'Dogherty and his wife, Anne, daughter of Roger Scully of Cashel. He entered the army in 1802.

His brother, Theobald O'Dogherty, had a distinguished career with the Royal Marines, but he never received the promotions he deserved because of his Irish Catholic background. To advance his career, Richard elected to convert to Protestantism and change the spelling of his surname—from O'Dogherty to the more Anglo Doherty. He was rewarded with a promotions, followed by a knighthood in 1841.

He was Governor of Sierra Leone from 13 June 1837 to 16 December 1840. He was succeeded as governor in 1840 by Sir John Jeremie and knighted in 1841. He was Commander in Chief of Jamaica in 1853.

He was colonel of the 11th (North Devonshire) Regiment from 1857 until his death in 1862 in Richmond, Surrey.

In 1845, he married  widow Rachel Sophia Munro (née Ludford), who was the daughter of physician  Jonathan Anderson Ludford of Jamaica.

References

Knights Bachelor
Devonshire Regiment officers
Governors of Sierra Leone
1785 births
1862 deaths
Date of birth missing
People from County Tipperary
Converts to Anglicanism from Roman Catholicism
Military personnel from County Tipperary
British Army lieutenant generals